The Order of the Star of Ethiopia was established as an order of knighthood of the Ethiopian Empire, founded by the Negus of Shoa and later Emperor of Ethiopia Menelik II in 1884–1885.  It is currently awarded as a house order by the Crown Council of Ethiopia.

The Order was established to honour foreign and domestic civilian and military officials and individuals for service to the country, and is considered the fifth ranking order of the Empire of Ethiopia alongside the Order of Menelik II.

All grades of the Order are approved for wear as a foreign order (i.e. after all British and other Commonwealth decorations) by Elizabeth II, Queen of the United Kingdom and the other Commonwealth realms, as it is on the "Schedule of Approved Countries and Awards". Elizabeth II herself was awarded the Chain and Collar of the Order of the Seal of Solomon.

Grades

 First Class
 Grand Cross (GCSE)

 Second Class
  Grand Officer (GOSE) 
  Commander (CSE)

 Third Class
  Officer (OSE)
  Member (MSE)

Recipients 

 Head
 Haile Selassie
 Grand Crosses
 Abbas II of Egypt
 Alfred, 2nd Prince of Montenuovo
 Prince Arthur, Duke of Connaught and Strathearn
 Sidney Barton
 Edward VII
 Carl August Ehrensvärd (1892–1974)
 George VI
 Knud, Hereditary Prince of Denmark
 Hussein Refki Pasha
 Seyoum Mengesha
 Wilfred Gilbert Thesiger
 Alamsyah Ratu Perwiranegara 
 Sergio Fernandez de Cordova de Veyga
 Grand Officers
 Johannes Brun (officer)
 Clifford Henry Fitzherbert Plowman
 Tunku Osman
 Paul Scully-Power
 Commanders
 Guy Gibson Campbell
 Ralph Cobbold
 Meir Dizengoff
 Adolf Bredo Stabell (diplomat)
 Grand Cordons
 Amha Selassie
 Kenneth Anderson (British Army officer)
 Desta Damtew
 Prince Makonnen
 Officers
 Philip Norton Banks
 Lord Edward Gleichen
 Yngve A. A. Larsson
 John Qvale
 Members
 Unclassified
 Leonid Artamonov
 William Horwood (police commissioner)
 Harald Juell
 Gordon MacCreagh
 Mary of Teck
 Georgios Prokopiou
 George C. Thorpe

References

Literature
 Honneur & Gloire. Les trésors de la collection Spada, Paris: Musée national de la Légion d’honneur et des ordres de chevalerie, 2008, p. 354–355.
 «Ethiopian Imperial Orders» i Guy Stair Sainty og Rafal Heydel-Mankoo: World Orders of Knighthood and Merit, andre bind, Buckingham: Burke's Peerage, 2006, p. 779–781.
 Gregor Gatscher-Riedl:  Die Orden des äthiopischen Kaiserreichs und der salomonidischen Dynastie. In: Zeitschrift der Österreichischen Gesellschaft für Ordenskunde, Nr. 91, Wien, August 2013, p. 1-22.

External links

Star of Ethiopia
Star of Ethiopia
Orders, decorations, and medals of Ethiopia